Under the English feudal system several different forms of land tenure existed, each effectively a contract with differing rights and duties attached thereto. Such tenures could be either free-hold, signifying that they were hereditable or perpetual, or non-free where the tenancy terminated on the tenant's death or at an earlier specified period.

High medieval period
In England's ancient past large parts of the realm were unoccupied and owned as allodial titles: the landowners simply cooperated with the king out of a mutual interest instead of legal obligation. It was not until the Norman conquest, when William the Conqueror declared himself to be the sole allodial owner of the entire realm, that land tenures changed drastically. In William's kingdom the common exchange and sale of land became restricted and all landholders were made to provide a service to their lord ("no land without a lord").

Norman reforms
William stripped the land from those who opposed him and redistributed it among his followers. He introduced a new type of feudalism, in which obligation extended right down through the hierarchy, a model informed by the military system.

Barony and knight-service
The tenants-in-chief held their land by the tenure of barony, which required the tenant to provide a number of knights for their liege for 40 days per annum. After the served days, the liege was obliged either to begin paying the knights, or to dismiss them. However, tenants who held their land by the tenure of knight-service were not permitted to pass their lands to the heir automatically, but were required to obtain the lord's approval.

The system failed because the assessment of knight's fees became impossible to maintain. A few estates retained the same wealth and population as when first enfeoffed, with the result that the lord provided only a small number of the knights whom he was actually able to muster. Another issue was the practice of subinfeudation, by which the subtenants were able to alienate the land to tenants of their own. This became unpopular among the superior lords, and was banned by Edward I in his edict Quia Emptores. In compensation, the sale of properties was made legal.

Late medieval period
During the course of the late medieval period, knight-service came to be replaced by the tenure of scutage, under which tenants paid tax assessed according to their knight's fee, instead of providing knights. Before the mid-13th century the fiefdoms had not been heritable owing to the uncertainty of whether the heir of the tenant would be capable of providing the required knight-service. As scutage replaced knight-service, that question fell outside consideration. Heirs were therefore able to succeed fiefs in exchange for the payment of a type of inheritance tax.

The Tenures Abolition Act 1660 declared that all land was to be held by socage tenure, ending the feudal tenure.

Military tenure
(Generally freehold)
by barony (per baroniam). Such tenure constituted the holder a feudal baron, and was the highest degree of tenure. It imposed duties of military service and required attendance at parliament. All such holders were necessarily tenants-in-chief.
by knight-service. This was a tenure ranking below barony, and was likewise for military service, of a lesser extent. It could be held in capite from the king or as a mesne tenancy from a tenant-in-chief.
by castle-guard. This was a form of military service which involved guarding a nearby castle for a specified number of days per year.
by scutage where the military service obligations had been commuted, or replaced, by money payments.

Non-military tenure
by frankalmoinage, generally a tenure restricted to clerics.
by fee-farm, a grant of the right to collect and retain revenues in return for a fixed rent. Usually a royal grant.
by copyhold, where the duties and obligations were tailored to the requirements of the lord of the manor and a copy of the terms agreed was entered on the roll of the manorial court as a record.
by socage. A form of tenure, involving payment in produce or in money.
Quit-rent. The payment of an annual fee in exchange for freedom from all other feudal obligations.

Uncategorised
by serjeanty. Such tenure ranged from non-standard service in the king's army, to petty renders scarcely distinguishable from those of the rent-paying tenant or socager. Service in a ceremonial form is termed "grand serjeanty" whilst that of a more functional or menial nature is termed "petty serjeanty".
Parage. A joint tenancy where the estate is not partitioned, but the senior tenant alone is responsible for estate obligations; it appears frequently in Domesday Book. (Coolf tenuit in paragio de rege, manor of Welige, IoW).
Free burgage, tenure within a town or city.
Curtesy tenure. A tenant "by the curtesy of England", being a widower of a wife by whom he has issue by her born alive, in respect of her enseized right in land, generally originating in a paternal inheritance. Roger Bigod claimed it unsuccessfully on the death of his wife Aliva.
Tenant-at-will. Such tenant had no security of tenure whatsoever. It developed into the more secure "copyhold tenure", where the terms were set out in an entry on the manorial roll.
Gavelkind. Frequently found in mediaeval Kent, "held according to the custom of gavelkind". It withdrew a dower from a widow if she remarried.
Fee simple, a tenure with no service obligations attached which could be a free-holding (i.e. hereditable) or non-free (expiring on the tenant's death). On the abolition of feudal tenure in 1660, all existing tenures were converted to this tenure.

References

Feudal duties
Feudalism in England
Real property law
English property law
Medieval English law
Land tenure